Aldis may refer to:
Aldis (name), a masculine given name
Aldis SRL, a Romanian meat and smallgoods processing company
Aldis lamp, a type of signal lamp
ALDIS (Austrian Lightning Detection & Information System) a lightning detection sensor network on the territory of Austria

See also
Aldi